Billie Jean King was the defending champion.

Unseeded Leslie Allen won the title, defeating top-seeded Hana Mandlíková in the final 6–4, 6–4.

Seeds
A champion seed is indicated in bold text while text in italics indicates the round in which that seed was eliminated. 

  Hana Mandlíková (final)
  Wendy Turnbull (quarterfinals)
  Pam Shriver (semifinals)
  Virginia Ruzici (quarterfinals)
  Regina Maršíková  (first round)
  Mima Jaušovec (quarterfinals)
  Sue Barker (second round)
  JoAnne Russell (first round)

Draw

Final

Top half

Bottom half

References

External links
 Main draw

Virginia Slims of Detroit
1981 WTA Tour